The Mafwe are one of the tribal peoples of the country of Namibia, and one of the 38 groups that comprise the Lozi people.

Fwe language: https://en.wikipedia.org/wiki/Fwe_language

Kings and leaders
Leaders since Kabende Sita carry the honorary title of Mamili.

Sebitwane, Kololo King, ? - 1851
Sekeletu, Kololo King, 1851-1863
Mbololo, Kololo King, 1863-1864
Lewanika, Lozi King, 1864-1909
Moremi II, Tswana King, 1876 - 1890
Sekgoma Lethsolathebe, Tswana King, 1891-1906
Kabende Simata, Mamili, 1864-1914
Simata Lifasi, 1914-1931
Lifasi Simata Mamili, 1931-1944
Simata Simasiku Mamili, 1944-1971
Richard Muhinda, Mamili, 1971-1987
Boniface Bebi Mamili, 1987-1998
George Simasiku, Mamili 1999-

References

Lozi people